The Scales of Injustice is a Virgin Missing Adventures original novel written by Gary Russell based on the long-running British science fiction television series Doctor Who. It features the Third Doctor, Liz Shaw and UNIT.

Plot
The Doctor suspects Silurians are afoot when a child goes missing in a seaside community, a policewoman begins drawing cave paintings, and the employees at the mysterious Glasshouse project are desperate to hide something. Meanwhile, his assistant Liz Shaw teams up with a journalist to search for people who don't exist, and Brigadier Lethbridge Stewart copes with personal and UNIT crises. And how does all this link back to the very heart of the British Government?

Continuity
This novel begins a trilogy concerning the Pale Man and the Irish Twins which continues in Russell's two Past Doctor Adventures Business Unusual and Instruments of Darkness.

This novel provides the departure scene for the companion Liz Shaw. In the television series her final appearance was in the last episode of Inferno, but she is not seen to leave the Doctor. In the Terror of the Autons her departure was announced by the Brigadier.

The novel is also designed as a prequel to the events of the television serial Warriors of the Deep. Specifically, this story explains how the Doctor knows Icthar and how he knows of the Triad and the Myrka.

References

External links
The Cloister Library - The Scales of Injustice

1996 British novels
1996 science fiction novels
Third Doctor novels
Virgin Missing Adventures
Novels by Gary Russell